Asura albidorsalis is a moth of the subfamily Arctiinae. The species was first described by Alfred Ernest Wileman in 1914. It is endemic to Taiwan.

The wingspan is about 35 mm.

References

albidorsalis
Moths described in 1914
Moths of Taiwan
Endemic fauna of Taiwan